Dummerstorf is a municipality  in the Rostock district, in Mecklenburg-Vorpommern, Germany.

Geography
The municipality Dummerstorf is located approximately 10 km in the southeast of Rostock.

Districts
The municipality is composed since 7 June 2009 of the former municipalities of the dissolved Amt Warnow-Ost.

Districts are:
 Dummerstorf with Bandelstorf, Dishley, Göldenitz, Pankelow, Schlage and Waldeck
 Damm with Groß Viegeln, Klein Viegeln and Reez
 Kavelstorf with Griebnitz, Klingendorf and Niex
 Kessin with Beselin and Hohen Schwarfs
 Lieblingshof with Godow, Petschow and Wolfsberg
 Prisannewitz with Prisannewitz-Ausbau, Groß Potrems, Klein Potrems, Scharstorf and Wendorf

Politics 
Since the local elections on 25 May 2014 the seats of the municipal council are distributed as follows:

Personalities
 Carl Schlettwein (* 1830 in Bandelstorf; † 1897 in Wiesbaden), landowner of Bandelstorf and administrative lawyer.

References